The first Sydney Intercolonial Exhibition was a series of exhibitions inspired by the historic Great Exhibition held in London in 1851. The Colony of New South Wales mounted its first such exhibition in 1854 in preparation for the Paris Exhibition of 1855, another in 1861 in preparation for the London Exhibition of 1862, and then several more until being held annually throughout the 1870s under the name Metropolitan Intercolonial Exhibition. 

The term "intercolonial" referred to the British colonies on the continent of Australia, which did not federate until 1901. 

The major impetus for intercolonial exhibitions derived from the Agricultural Society of New South Wales, which from 1858 onwards sponsored annual shows at the Society's grounds at Parramatta, about 20 km (12 mi) west of  Sydney's central business district. In 1869, the exhibitions underwent rapid expansion on relocation to the newly established Prince Alfred Park, Surry Hills, immediately south-east of the CBD. The Sydney Intercolonial Exhibition building opened in 1870 on the site. 

Further expanding the scope of its exhibitions, Sydney held the first international exhibition, the Sydney International Exhibition, in the Garden Palace in The Domain in 1879.

See also

History of Sydney
List of world's fairs

References

External links
 needs wayback machine
 needs wayback machine

 

1870 in Australia
1870 festivals
19th century in Sydney
Colonial exhibitions
Events in Sydney
Festivals established in 1870
World's fairs in Sydney